Jeffrey Kurland is an American costume designer. He was nominated for an Academy Award in the category Best Costume Design for the film Bullets Over Broadway. Kurland has also been awarded the Costume Designers Guild’s Career Achievement Award.

Filmography

References

External links 

Living people
Place of birth missing (living people)
Year of birth missing (living people)
American costume designers